Verteuil-d'Agenais is a commune in the Lot-et-Garonne department in south-western France.

Monuments
 Château de Verteuil

See also
Communes of the Lot-et-Garonne department

References

Verteuildagenais